In enzymology, a formaldehyde dehydrogenase is an enzyme that catalyzes the chemical reaction

formaldehyde + NAD+ + H2O  formate + NADH + H+

The 3 substrates of this enzyme are formaldehyde, NAD+, and H2O, whereas its 3 products are formate, NADH, and H+.

This enzyme belongs to the family of oxidoreductases, specifically those acting on the aldehyde or oxo group of donor with NAD+ or NADP+ as acceptor.  The systematic name of this enzyme class is formaldehyde:NAD+ oxidoreductase. Other names in common use include NAD+-linked formaldehyde dehydrogenase, s-nitrosoglutathione reductase (GSNO reductase) and NAD+-dependent formaldehyde dehydrogenase.  This enzyme participates in methane metabolism.

Ubiquitous function 

S-nitrosoglutathione reductase (GSNOR) is a class III alcohol dehydrogenase (ADH) encoded by the ADH5 gene in humans.  It is a primordial ADH that is ubiquitously expressed in plant and animals alike.  GSNOR reduces S-nitrosoglutathione (GSNO) to the unstable intermediate, S-hydroxylaminoglutathione, which then rearranges to form glutathione sulfinamide, or in the presence of GSH, forms oxidized glutathione (GSSG) and hydroxyl amine. Through this catabolic process, GSNOR regulates the cellular concentrations of GSNO and plays a central role in regulating the levels of endogenous S-nitrosothiols and controlling protein S-nitrosylation-based signaling.  As an example of S-nitrosylation-based signaling, Barglow et al. showed that GSNO selectively S-nitrosylates reduced thioredoxin at cysteine 62. Nitrosylated thioredoxin, via directed protein-protein interaction, trans-nitrosylates the active site cysteine of caspase-3 thus inactivating caspase-3 and preventing induction of apoptosis.

As might be expected of an enzyme involved in regulating NO levels and signaling, pleiotropic effects are observed in GSNOR knockout models. Deleting the GSNOR gene from both yeast and mice increased the cellular levels of GSNO and nitrosylated proteins, and the yeast cells showed increased susceptibility to nitrosative stress. Null mice show increased levels of S-nitrosated proteins, increased beta adrenergic receptor numbers in lung and heart, diminished tachyphylaxis to β2-adrenergic receptor agonists, hyporesponsiveness to methacholine and  allergen challenge and reduced infarct size after occlusion of the coronary artery. In addition, null mice show increased tissue damage and mortality following challenge with bacteria or endotoxin and are hypotensive under anesthesia yet normotensive in the conscious state.

Role in disease 

It has been shown that GSNOR may have an important role in respiratory diseases such as asthma.  GSNOR expression has been inversely correlated with S-nitrosothiol (SNO) levels in the alveolar lining fluid in the lung and with responsiveness to methacholine challenge in patients with mild asthma compared to normal subjects. Furthermore, there are lowered SNOs in tracheal irrigations in asthmatic children with respiratory failure in comparison to normal children undergoing elective surgery and NO species are elevated in asthma patients when exposed to antigen.

Assessing the gene expression of the ADHs in nonalcoholic steatohepatitis (NASH) patients has shown elevated levels of all ADHs, but primarily ADH1 and ADH4 (up to 40-fold increased).  ADH5 showed a ~4-fold increase in gene expression.

Structural studies

As of late 2007, only one structure has been solved for this class of enzymes, with the PDB accession code .

References

Further reading 

 

EC 1.2.1
NADH-dependent enzymes
Enzymes of known structure